Antillophos chalcedonius is a species of sea snail, a marine gastropod mollusc in the family Nassariidae, the true whelks and the like.

Description

Distribution
This marine species occurs off Cuba.

References

External links
 Watters, G. T. (2009). A revision of the western Atlantic Ocean genera Anna, Antillophos, Bailya, Caducifer, Monostiolum, and Parviphos, with description of a new genus, Dianthiphos, and notes on Engina and Hesperisternia Gastropoda: Buccinidae: Pisaniinae) and Cumia (Colubrariidae). The Nautilus. 123(4): 225-275
 Galindo, L. A.; Puillandre, N.; Utge, J.; Lozouet, P.; Bouchet, P. (2016). The phylogeny and systematics of the Nassariidae revisited (Gastropoda, Buccinoidea). Molecular Phylogenetics and Evolution. 99: 337-353.

Nassariidae
Gastropods described in 2009